Pitman Lake is a lake in the U.S. state of Washington.

Pitman Lake has the name of Jesse Pitman, a local landholder.

References

Lakes of Thurston County, Washington